EGH may refer to:
 Ecobank Ghana, a commercial bank
 Egg Harbor City station, a train station in New Jersey, United States
 Egham railway station, in England
 Eygelshoven railway station, in the Netherlands
 Elder of the Order of the Golden Heart of Kenya